Scotland at the 1990 Commonwealth Games was represented by the Commonwealth Games Council for Scotland (CGCE).

Scotland joined the Commonwealth of Nations as part of the United Kingdom in 1931.

In this competition Scotland finished ninth in the medals table behind Nigeria.

Athletics

Gold 
 Liz McColgan, Women's 10,000 metres.

Silver 
 Mark Davidson, David Strang, Tom McKean, Brian Whittle and Duncan Mathieson, Men's 4x400 metres Relay.

 Yvonne Murray, Women's 3000 metres.

Bronze 
 Geoff Parsons, Men's High Jump

 Liz McColgan, Women's 3000 metres.

Bowls

Gold 
 Denis Love, George Adrain, Ian Bruce and Willie Wood, Men's Fours

Bronze 
 Richard Corsie, Men's Singles

Boxing

Gold 
 Charlie Kane, Men's Light Welterweight

Bronze 
 David Anderson, Men's Lightweight

Judo

Gold 
 Loretta Cusack, Women's Lightweight

Silver 
 Mark Preston, Men's Half Lightweight

 Winston Sweatman, Men's Middleweight

 Claire Shiach, Women's Half Lightweight

Bronze 
 William Cusack, Men's Lightweight

 Graham Campbell, Men's Half Heavyweight

 Graham Campbell, Men's Open

 Donna Robertson, Women's Extra Lightweight

Shooting

Gold 
 Ian Marsden and James Dunlop, Men's Shotgun, Skeet - Pairs

Bronze 
 William Murray and Robert Law, Men's Small Bore Rifle, Three Positions - Pairs

Weightlifting

Silver 
 Alan Ogilvie, Men's Bantamweight - Snatch

 Alan Ogilvie, Men's Bantamweight - Overall

Bronze 
 Alan Ogilvie, Men's Bantamweight - Clean and Jerk

References 
 - Past Commonwealth Games

External links 
 Commonwealth Games Medalists - GB Athletics Full list of Commonwealth Games Medalists

Scotland at the Commonwealth Games
Commonwealth Games
Nations at the 1990 Commonwealth Games